Statistics of 2000 National Football Championship (Bangladesh).

Overview
Abahani Limited (Dhaka) won the championship.

References
 RSSSF

 
1